The SJPF Segunda Liga Young Player of the Month (often called Second League Young Player of the Month) is an association football award that recognizes the best Segunda Liga young player each month of the season and is conceived by the SJPF (syndicate of professional football players). The award has been presented since the 2010–11 season and the recipient is based on individual scores assigned by the three national sports dailies, A Bola, Record, and O Jogo. Only Portuguese players under the age of 23 are in contention to win the award.

Winners

Key

Statistics

Awards won by club

Multiple winners

Awards won by position

See also
 SJPF Player of the Month
 SJPF Young Player of the Month
 SJPF Segunda Liga Player of the Month

References

External links
  The official website at SJPF

 
Portuguese football trophies and awards
Association football player non-biographical articles